Johar Valley (also known as Milam Valley or Gori Ganga Valley) is a valley located in Pithoragarh district of Uttarakhand, India, along the Gori Ganga river. The valley used to be a major trade route with Tibet. The best known villages in the valley are Martoli and Milam.

Geography
The alpine trans-humant village of Milam is located one kilometer below the snout of the Milam glacier.  Here a left-bank stream called Gonka joins the Gori.  The valley provides the approach route for access to peaks such as Nanda Devi East, Hardeol, Trishuli, Panchchuli and Nanda Kot.

See also

 Shauka - Johar
 Kumaon
 List of valleys of India

References

External links 

Valleys of Uttarakhand
Geography of Pithoragarh district